The 2018–19 Handbollsligan was the 85th season of the top division of Swedish handball. 14 teams competed in the league. The eight highest placed teams qualified for the playoffs, whereas teams 11–13 had to play relegation playoffs against teams from the second division, and team 14 was relegated automatically. IFK Kristianstad won the regular season, but IK Sävehof won the playoffs and claimed their sixth Swedish title.

League table

Playoffs bracket

Attendance

References 

Swedish handball competitions